B'z Live-Gym 2006 "Monster's Garage" is the sixth live VHS/DVD released by Japanese rock duo B'z. It features live footage of the Monster Live-Gym 2006, one of their famous Live Gyms. On December 22, 2010, the first two discs were re-released in Blu-ray. The Blu-ray release also contain the documentary disc but still in DVD.

Track listing

Disc One 
All-Out-Attack
Juice
 (Pierrot)
Netemosametemo (ネテモサメテモ)
Yuruginai Mono Hitotsu (ゆるぎないものひとつ)
Koi no Sama-Sesshon (恋のサマーセッション) (Koi no Summer Session)
Mvp
Bad Communication
Ultra Soul
Tak's Solo ~ #Amadare Buru-zu (Tak's Solo ~ #雨だれぶるーず)
Happy Birthday
Brotherhood
Blowin'
Ocean

Disc Two 
Monster
Shodou (衝動)
Ai no Bakudan (愛のバクダン)
Love Phantom
Splash!
Ashita Mata Hi ga Noboru Nara (明日また陽が昇るなら)
Giri Giri Chop (ギリギリ Chop)
Run

Disc Three 
「Off Limits ~How Two Men Created a Monster~」

Certifications

External links 
B'z Official Website 

B'z video albums
2006 video albums
Live video albums
2006 live albums